St. James Church and Rectory is a historic Episcopal church on NY 17B on the north side, east of the junction with NY 97, within the Town of Delaware in Callicoon, Sullivan County, New York.  The church was built in 1928 and the rectory about 1912.  The church is a gabled building with a stuccoed exterior in the Mission style.  It features a bell tower centered at the peak of the front-facing gable.  The rectory is a simplified Queen Anne style residence.

It was added to the National Register of Historic Places in 1993.

References

Episcopal church buildings in New York (state)
Churches on the National Register of Historic Places in New York (state)
Queen Anne architecture in New York (state)
Churches completed in 1928
20th-century Episcopal church buildings
Houses on the National Register of Historic Places in New York (state)
Churches in Sullivan County, New York
Houses in Sullivan County, New York
National Register of Historic Places in Sullivan County, New York